Kerkenna may refer to:

The Kerkenna Islands, an alternative spelling for the Kerkennah Islands
USS Kerkenna (1900), a United States Navy cargo ship in commission from 1918 to 1919